St. Xavier’s School, Sahebganj is a private Catholic primary and secondary school located in Sahebganj, Jharkhand, India. The school was founded by the Maltese Jesuits in 1957 with English as the medium of instruction. It is co-educational, primary through higher secondary, and prepares students for the Indian Certificate of Secondary Education (ICSE). 

Members of the Society of Jesus from the island of Malta had in 1930 opened schools with Hindi as the teaching language at Guhiajori and Tinpahar in the Santhal Pargana district of Bihar state. They then determined to open a school in Sahebganj, Jharkhand, with English as the medium of instruction.

See also

 List of Jesuit schools
 List of schools in Jharkhand
 Violence against Christians in India

References

External links 
 Sahibganj Wikipedia Page
 Saint Xavier's School, Sahibganj official website

Jesuit secondary schools in India
Roman Catholic schools in Bihar
Educational institutions established in 1957
Christian schools in Jharkhand
High schools and secondary schools in Jharkhand
1957 establishments in Bihar